The Big Splash is a 1935 British comedy film directed by Leslie S. Hiscott and starring Frank Pettingell, Finlay Currie and Marguerite Allan. A millionaire hires a man to play his double. It was made as a quota quickie at Beaconsfield Studios.

Cast
Frank Pettingell as Bodkin
Finlay Currie as Hartley Bassett
Marguerite Allan as Germaine
Drusilla Wills as Mrs Bodkin
Roy Royston as Jack Trent
Ben Welden as Crook
Percy Parsons as Crook

References

Bibliography
 Chibnall, Steve. Quota Quickies: The Birth of the British 'B' Film. British Film Institute, 2007.
 Low, Rachael. Filmmaking in 1930s Britain. George Allen & Unwin, 1985.
 Wood, Linda. British Films, 1927-1939. British Film Institute, 1986.

External links
 

1935 films
British comedy films
1935 comedy films
1930s English-language films
Films directed by Leslie S. Hiscott
Films shot at Beaconsfield Studios
Quota quickies
British black-and-white films
1930s British films